MTV (originally an initialism of Music Television) is a 24-hour American cable music video channel officially launched on August 1, 1981. Based in New York City, it serves as the flagship property of the MTV Entertainment Group, part of Paramount Media Networks, a division of Paramount Global.

The channel originally aired music videos and related programming as guided by television personalities known as video jockeys, or VJs. In the years since its inception, it significantly toned down its focus on music in favor of original reality programming for teenagers and young adults.

Since early 2020, MTV has devoted most of its programming schedule to select programs, primarily Ridiculousness, which in June 2020 aired "for 113 hours out of the network’s entire 168-hour lineup".

MTV has spawned numerous sister channels in the United States and affiliated channels internationally, some of which have since gone independent. Approximately 90.6 million households in the US received MTV as of January 2017.

History

1964–1977: Previous concepts 

Ideas for music television began in the 1960s. The Beatles used music videos to promote their records starting in the mid-1960s. Their 1964 film A Hard Day's Night, and particularly its performance of the song "Can't Buy Me Love", led MTV to later honor the film's director Richard Lester with an award for "basically inventing the music video".

In 1967, a Los Angeles company called Charlatan Productions began producing promotional films for rock groups, with a unique approach that involved interpreting individual songs by crafting original scripts and artistic scenarios to match.  Charlatan was founded by filmmakers Peter Gardiner and Allen Daviau, both of whom were special effects producers that year for the film, The Trip. Tom Rounds, former program director for San Francisco's top 40 radio station KFRC, was brought on board later in 1967 as Charlatan president. Under Rounds’ leadership, and on contract to record companies, Charlatan produced the short, song-length promo films and then distributed them on videotape to TV stations around the country. By mid-1968, Charlatan had already completed 40 films for 15 record companies, for artists such as Jimi Hendrix, The Animals, Steppenwolf, Aretha Franklin, Richie Havens, The Who, The Rascals, Paul Revere & the Raiders, Connie Francis, The Cowsills, and Ricky Nelson.

In 1974, Gary Van Haas, vice president of Televak Corporation, created Music Video TV, a channel with video disc jockeys, to be shown in record stores across the United States, and promoted it to distributors and retailers in a May 1974 issue of Billboard.

1977–1981: Pre-history 
In 1977, Warner Cable, a division of Warner Communications (now as "WBD") and the precursor of Warner-Amex Satellite Entertainment, launched the first two-way interactive cable TV system, QUBE, in Columbus, Ohio. It offered many interactive programs – one of which was "Sight on Sound", a show featuring concert footage and music-oriented programs where viewers could vote for their favorite songs and artists.

MTV's original format was created by media executive Robert W. Pittman, later president and CEO of MTV Networks. He tested the format by producing and hosting a 15-minute show, Album Tracks, on New York City's WNBC-TV in the late 1970s.

Pittman's boss, Warner executive vice president John Lack, had shepherded PopClips, a TV series created by Monkee-turned-solo-artist Michael Nesmith, whose attention has turned to the music video format in the late 1970s.

1981–1991

Launch 

On Saturday, August 1, 1981, at 12:01 a.m. Eastern Time, MTV was launched with the words "Ladies and gentlemen, rock and roll," spoken by John Lack and played over footage of the first Space Shuttle launch countdown of Columbia (which took place earlier that year) and the launch of Apollo 11. The words were followed by the original MTV theme song, a vivid rock tune composed by Jonathan Elias and John Petersen, playing over the U.S. flag changed to show MTV's logo changing into different textures and designs. MTV producers Alan Goodman and Fred Seibert used this public domain footage as a concept; Seibert said that they had originally planned to use Neil Armstrong's "One small step" quote, but lawyers said that Armstrong owned his name and likeness and that he had refused, so the quote was replaced with a beeping sound. A shortened version of the shuttle launch ID ran at the top of every hour in different forms, from MTV's first day until it was pulled in early 1986 in the wake of the Challenger disaster.

The first music video on MTV, which at the time was only available to homes in New Jersey, was the Buggles' "Video Killed the Radio Star". It was followed by Pat Benatar's "You Better Run". Occasionally the screen went black when an employee at MTV inserted a tape into a VCR. MTV's lower third graphics near the beginnings and ends of videos eventually used the recognizable Kabel typeface for about 25 years; but they varied on MTV's first day, set in a different typeface, and including details such as the song's year and record label. MTV's on-air programming was originally produced from the Teletronics studio facility at West 33rd Street in Manhattan, NY; programming was uplinked to satellite from a facility in Hauppauge, NY that also served as the uplink for sister networks Nickelodeon and The Movie Channel (originally, then-owner Warner-Amex Satellite Entertainment had planned to uplink MTV from a facility located at the studios of WIVB-TV in Buffalo, NY, where Nickelodeon and The Movie Channel had been uplinked; said facility was planned to be expanded to handle MTV's needs, but the deal with WIVB fell apart when Warner-Amex was unable to reach a deal with channel 4's ownership concerning a long-term lease). MTV later moved studio facilities to Unitel Video's complex located on 57th Street (ironically located across the street from the CBS Broadcast Center, owned by future corporate sibling CBS) in 1987, remaining until 1995 when MTV chose to begin producing studio content in-house.

As programming chief, Robert W. Pittman recruited and managed a team of co-founders for the launch that included Tom Freston (who succeeded Pittman as CEO of MTV Networks), Fred Seibert and John Sykes. They were joined by Carolyn Baker (original head of talent and acquisition), Marshall Cohen (original head of research), Gail Sparrow (of talent and acquisition), Sue Steinberg (executive producer), Julian Goldberg, Steve Lawrence, Geoff Bolton; studio producers and MTV News writers/associate producers Liz Nealon, Nancy LaPook and Robin Zorn; Steve Casey (creator of the name "MTV" and its first program director), Marcy Brafman, Richard Schenkman, Ronald E. "Buzz" Brindle, and Robert Morton. Kenneth M. Miller is credited as MTV's first technical director at its New York City-based network operations facility.

Within two months, record stores were selling music local radio stations were not playing, such as Men at Work, Bow Wow Wow and the Human League. MTV also sparked the Second British Invasion, featuring existing videos by Britsh acts who had used the format for several years (for example, on BBC's Top of the Pops).

MTV targeted an audience of ages 12 to 34. However its self-conducted research showed that over 50% of its audience was 12–24, and that this group watched for an average of 30 minutes to two hours a day. As the PBS series Frontline explored, MTV was a driving force that catapulted music videos to a mainstream audience, turning music videos into an art form as well as a marketing machine that became beneficial to artists."

Original VJs and format 

MTV's earliest format was modeled after AOR (album-oriented rock) radio. It underwent a transition to emulate a full Top 40 station in 1984. Fresh-faced young men and women hosted its programming and introduced videos. Many VJs became celebrities in their own right. MTV's five original VJs in 1981 were Nina Blackwood, Mark Goodman, Alan Hunter, J. J. Jackson and Martha Quinn. Popular New York DJ Meg Griffin was going to be a VJ, but decided against it at the last minute. The VJs were hired to fit certain demographics the channel was trying to obtain: Goodman was the affable everyman; Hunter, the popular jock; Jackson, the hip radio veteran; Blackwood, the bombshell vixen; and Quinn, the girl next door. Due to uncertainty around the channel's success, the VJs were told not to buy permanent residences and to keep their second jobs.

The VJs recorded intro and outro voiceovers before broadcast, along with music news, interviews, concert dates and promotions. These segments appeared to air live and debut on MTV 24/7, but they were pre-taped within a regular work week at MTV's studios.

Rock bands and performers of the 1980s who appeared on MTV ranged from new wave to soft rock and heavy metal  including Adam Ant, Bryan Adams, Pat Benatar, Blondie, the Cars, Culture Club, Def Leppard, Dire Straits (whose 1985 song and video "Money for Nothing" included the slogan "I want my MTV" in its lyrics), Duran Duran, Eurythmics, Peter Gabriel, Genesis, Daryl Hall & John Oates, Billy Idol, Billy Joel, John Mellencamp, Mötley Crüe, Tom Petty and the Heartbreakers, the Police, Prince, Ratt, Ultravox, U2, Van Halen and ZZ Top.

In 1984, more record companies and artists began making clips, realizing the popularity of MTV and the growing medium. To accommodate the influx of videos, MTV announced changes to its playlists in the November 3, 1984, issue of Billboard that took effect the next week. Playlist rotation categories were expanded from three (Light, Medium, Heavy) to seven: New, Light, Breakout, Medium, Active, Heavy and Power. This ensured that artists with chart hits got the exposure they deserved, with Medium being a home for established hits still on the climb up to the top 10; and Heavy a home for the big hitswithout the bells and whistlesjust the exposure they commanded.

Flashdance (1983) was the first film whose promoters supplied MTV with musical clips to compose promotional videos, which the channel included in its regular rotation.

The channel also rotated the music videos of "Weird Al" Yankovic, who made a career out of parodying other artists' videos. It also aired several of Yankovic's specials in the 1980s and 1990s, under the title Al TV.

PSAs and promotion of charitable causes and NFPs were woven into the MTV fabric. In 1985, MTV spearheaded a safe-sex initiative, in response to the AIDS epidemic, when it was perceived that many teens might be more receptive to the message there than from their parents. Its safe-sex campaign continues today as "It's Your Sex Life".

Video Music Awards 

In 1984, the channel produced its first MTV Video Music Awards show, or VMAs. The first award show, in 1984, was punctuated by a live performance by Madonna of "Like A Virgin". The statuettes that are handed out at the Video Music Awards are of the MTV moonman, the channel's original image from its first broadcast in 1981. Presently, the Video Music Awards are MTV's most watched annual event.

Special, annual events 

MTV began its annual Spring Break coverage in 1986, setting up temporary operations in Daytona Beach, Florida, for a week in March, broadcasting live eight hours per day. "Spring break is a youth culture event," MTV's vice president Doug Herzog said at the time. "We wanted to be part of it for that reason. It makes good sense for us to come down and go live from the center of it, because obviously the people there are the kinds of people who watch MTV."

The channel later expanded its beach-themed events to the summer, dedicating most of each summer season to broadcasting live from a beach house at different locations away from New York City, eventually leading to channel-wide branding throughout the summer in the 1990s and early 2000s such as Motel California, Summer Share, Isle of MTV, SoCal Summer, Summer in the Keys, and Shore Thing. MTV VJs hosted blocks of music videos, interview artists and bands, and introduced live performances and other programs from the beach house location each summer.

MTV also held week-long music events that took over the presentation of the channel. Examples from the 1990s and 2000s include All Access Week, a week in the summer dedicated to live concerts and festivals; Spankin' New Music Week, a week in the fall dedicated to brand new music videos; and week-long specials that culminated in a particular live event, such as Wanna be a VJ and the Video Music Awards.

At the end of each year, MTV takes advantage of its home location in New York City to broadcast live coverage on New Year's Eve in Times Square. Several live music performances are featured alongside interviews with artists and bands that were influential throughout the year. For many years from the 1980s to the 2000s, the channel upheld a tradition of having a band perform a cover song at midnight immediately following the beginning of the new year.

Live concert broadcasts 
Throughout its history, MTV has covered global benefit concert series live. For most of July 13, 1985, MTV showed the Live Aid concerts, held in London and Philadelphia and organized by Bob Geldof and Midge Ure to raise funds for famine relief in Ethiopia. While the ABC network showed only selected highlights during primetime, MTV broadcast 16 hours of coverage.

Along with VH1, MTV broadcast the Live 8 concerts, a series of concerts set in the G8 states and South Africa, on July 2, 2005. Live 8 preceded the 31st G8 summit and the 20th anniversary of Live Aid. MTV drew heavy criticism for its coverage of Live 8. The network cut to commercials, VJ commentary, or other performances during performances. Complaints surfaced on the Internet over MTV interrupting the reunion of Pink Floyd. In response, MTV president Van Toffler stated that he wanted to broadcast highlights from every venue of Live 8 on MTV and VH1, and clarified that network hosts talked over performances only in transition to commercials, informative segments or other musical performances. Toffler acknowledged that "MTV should not have placed such a high priority on showing so many acts, at the expense of airing complete sets by key artists." He also blamed the Pink Floyd interruption on a mandatory cable affiliate break. MTV averaged 1.4 million viewers for its original July 2 broadcast of Live 8. Consequently, MTV and VH1 aired five hours of uninterrupted Live 8 coverage on July 9, with each channel airing other blocks of artists.

Formatted music series 

1986 brought the departures of three of the five original VJs, as J. J. Jackson moved back to Los Angeles and returned to radio, while Nina Blackwood moved on to pursue new roles in television. Martha Quinn's contract was not renewed in late 1986 and she departed the network. She was brought back in early 1989 and stayed until 1992. Downtown Julie Brown was hired as the first new VJ as a replacement. In mid-1987, Alan Hunter and Mark Goodman ceased being full-time MTV veejays.

Return of the Rock 
Beginning in late 1997, MTV progressively reduced its airing of rock music videos, leading to the slogan among skeptics, "Rock is dead." Two years later, in the fall of 1999, MTV announced a special Return of the Rock weekend, in which new rock acts received airtime, after which a compilation album was released.

By 2000, Linkin Park, Sum 41, Jimmy Eat World, Mudvayne, Cold, At the Drive-In, Alien Ant Farm, and other acts were added to the musical rotation. MTV also launched the subscription channel MTVX to play rock music videos exclusively.

Total Request Live 

In 1997, MTV introduced its new studios in Times Square. MTV created four shows in the late 1990s that centered on music videos: MTV Live, Total Request, Say What?, and 12 Angry Viewers. A year later, in 1998, MTV merged Total Request and MTV Live into a live daily top 10 countdown show, Total Request Live, which became known as TRL. The original host was Carson Daly. The show included a live studio audience and was filmed in a windowed studio that allowed crowds to look in. According to Nielsen, the average audience for the show was at its highest in 1999 and continued with strong numbers through 2001. The program played the top ten pop, rock, R&B, and hip hop music videos, and featured live interviews with artists and celebrities. In 2003, Carson Daly left MTV and TRL to focus on his late night talk show on NBC. The series came to an end with a special finale episode, Total Finale Live, which aired November 16, 2008, and featured hosts and guests that previously appeared on the show.

From 1998 to 2003, MTV also aired several other music video programs from its studios. These programs included Say What? Karaoke, a game show hosted by Dave Holmes. In the early 2000s MTV aired VJ for a Day, hosted by Ray Munns. MTV also aired Hot Zone, hosted by Ananda Lewis, which featured pop music videos during the midday time period. Other programs at the time included Sucker Free, and BeatSuite.

Milestones and specials 
Around 1999 through 2001, as MTV aired fewer music videos throughout the day, it regularly aired compilation specials from its then 20-year history to look back on its roots. An all-encompassing special, MTV Uncensored, premiered in 1999 and was later released as a book.

Janet Jackson became the inaugural honoree of the "MTV Icon" award, "an annual recognition of artists who have made significant contributions to music, music video and pop culture while tremendously impacting the MTV generation." Subsequent recipients included Aerosmith, Metallica, and the Cure.

1995–2010: Shift from music 

From 1995 to 2000, MTV played 36.5% fewer music videos. MTV president Van Toffler stated: "Clearly, the novelty of just showing music videos has worn off. It's required us to reinvent ourselves to a contemporary audience." The network launched MTV Radio Network in 1995 with Westwood One. Despite targeted efforts to play certain types of music videos in limited rotation, MTV greatly reduced its overall rotation of music videos by the mid-2000s. A 10pm programming block for top shows and specials was created and called the 10 Spot. Dana Fuchs was the promo voice actor and writer for ads promoting these shows. While music videos were featured on MTV up to eight hours per day in 2000, the year 2008 saw an average of just three hours of music videos per day on MTV. It's been speculated that the rise of social media and websites like YouTube as an outlet for the promotion and viewing of music videos led to this reduction. During this time, MTV hired Nancy Bennett as Senior VP of creative and content development for MTV Networks Music. As the decade progressed, MTV video blocks would be relegated to the early morning hours. During his acceptance speech at the 2007 MTV Video Music Awards, Justin Timberlake implored MTV to "play more damn videos!" in response to these changes.

Over the next decade, MTV would engage in channel drift, gradually expanding its programming outside of music videos with programming lightly or heavily related to music. MTV became known for its reality programming, some of which followed the lives of musicians; The Osbournes, a reality show based on the everyday life of Black Sabbath frontman Ozzy Osbourne and his family premiered in 2002 and would become one of the network's premiere shows. It also kick-started a musical career for Kelly Osbourne, while Sharon Osbourne went on to host her own self-titled talk show on US television. Production ended on The Osbournes in November 2004. 2007's A Shot at Love with Tila Tequila, chronicling MySpace sensation Tila Tequila's journey to find a companion, was the subject of criticism due to Tequila's bisexuality.

MTV would also venture into adult animation, with shows like Celebrity Deathmatch, Undergrads, Clone High, and Daria each becoming cult classics. Simultaneously, MTV spawned the paranormal reality tv genre with the broadcast of MTV's Fear in 2000.

Prior to Total Request Live ending its run in 2008, MTV was experimenting with its remaining music programming under new formats. MTV first premiered a new music video programming block called FNMTV, and a weekly special event called FNMTV Premieres, hosted from Los Angeles by Pete Wentz of the band Fall Out Boy, which was designed to premiere new music videos and have viewers provide instantaneous feedback. AMTV, an early morning block, debuted in 2009. The block would rebrand as Music Feed in 2013 with a reduced schedule and, unlike FNMTV, featured many full-length music videos, news updates, interviews, and performances. MTV would continue to air music programming over the next decade, with the return of MTV Unplugged in 2009, the debut of 10 on Top in May 2010, and Hip Hop POV on April 12, 2012.

2009 saw the debut of Jersey Shore, which became a ratings success throughout its run and spawned the "MTV Shores" franchise, but would attract various controversies. With backlash towards what some consider too much superficial content on the network, a 2009 New York Times article also revealed plans to shift MTV's focus towards more socially conscious media, which the article labels "MTV for the Obama era." Shortly after Michael Jackson died on June 25, the channel aired several hours of Jackson's music videos, accompanied by live news specials featuring reactions from MTV personalities and other celebrities. The temporary shift in MTV's programming culminated the following week with the channel's live coverage of Jackson's memorial service. MTV aired similar one-hour live specials with music videos and news updates following the death of Whitney Houston on February 11, 2012, and the death of Adam Yauch of the Beastie Boys on May 4, 2012.

2010–present: Retirement from music videos 
In February 2010, MTV would drop the "Music Television" branding. The network would still air video premieres on occasion, through both television and real-time interaction with artists and celebrities on its website. Throughout the decade, music programming on the network would be scaled back. In April 2016, then-appointed MTV president Sean Atkins announced plans to restore music programming to the channel. On April 21, 2016, MTV announced that new Unplugged episodes will begin airing, as well as a new weekly performance series called Wonderland. On that same day, immediately after the death of Prince, MTV interrupted its usual programming to air Prince's music videos. In July 2017, it was announced that TRL would be returning to the network on October 2, 2017. The TRL relaunch only lasted until 2019. Throughout the 2010s, it was observed that MTV's daily schedule came to predominantly consist of film broadcasts and frequent marathons of select original programming (such as Ridiculousness), with criticism from many about the frequency of Ridiculousness marathons.

Alongside its unscripted slate, MTV would produce more scripted programming. Such shows included Awkward, an American version of Skins, and  a reimagining of Teen Wolf. In June 2012, the network announced the development of a television series based on the Scream franchise. As MTV would pivot back to unscripted programming towards the end of the decade, some of these shows would be moved to other networks.

Chris McCarthy was named president of MTV in 2016. In 2021, McCarthy was named president and CEO of MTV Entertainment Group (which also oversees Comedy Central, Paramount Network, TV Land, CMT, and Smithsonian Channel).

Programming 

As MTV expanded, music videos and VJ-guided programming were no longer the centerpiece of its programming. The channel's programming has covered a wide variety of genres and formats aimed at adolescents and young adults. In addition to its original programming, MTV has also aired original and syndicated programs from Paramount-owned siblings and third-party networks.

MTV is also a producer of films aimed at young adults through its production label, MTV Films, and has aired both its own theatrically released films and original made-for-television movies from MTV Studios in addition to acquired films.

In 2010, a study by the Gay and Lesbian Alliance Against Defamation found that of 207.5 hours of prime time programming on MTV, 42% included content reflecting the lives of gay, bisexual and transgender people. This was the highest in the industry and the highest percentage ever.

In 2018, MTV launched a new production unit under the MTV Studios name focused on producing new versions of MTV's library shows. This was later renamed MTV Entertainment Studios.

Logo and branding 

MTV's now-iconic logo was designed in 1981 by Manhattan Design (a collective formed by Frank Olinsky, Pat Gorman and Patty Rogoff) under the guidance of original creative director Fred Seibert. The block letter "M" was sketched by Rogoff, with the scribbled word "TV" spraypainted by Olinksky. The primary variant of MTV's logo at the time had the "M" in yellow and the "TV" in red. But unlike most television networks' logos at the time, the logo was constantly branded with different colors, patterns and images on a variety of station IDs. Examples include 1988's ID "Adam And Eve", where the "M" is an apple and the snake is the "TV". And for 1984's ID "Art History", the logo is shown in different art styles. The only constant aspects of MTV's logo at the time were its general shape and proportions, with everything else being dynamic.

MTV launched on August 1, 1981, with an extended network ID featuring the first landing on the moon (with still images acquired directly from NASA), which was a concept of Seibert's executed by Buzz Potamkin and Perpetual Motion Pictures. The ID then cut to the American flag planted on the moon's surface changed to show the MTV logo on it, which rapidly changed into different colors and patterns several times per second as the network's original guitar-driven jingle was played for the first time. After MTV's launch, the "moon landing" ID was edited to show only its ending, and was shown at the top of every hour until early 1986, when the ID was scrapped in light of the Space Shuttle Challenger disaster. The ID ran "more than 75,000 times each year (48 times each day), at the top and bottom of every hour every day" according to Seibert.

From the late 1990s to the early 2000s, MTV updated its on-air appearance at the beginning of every year and each summer, creating a consistent brand across all of its music-related shows. This style of channel-wide branding came to an end as MTV drastically reduced its number of music-related shows in the early to mid 2000s. Around this time, MTV introduced a static and single color digital on-screen graphic mainly grey during on-air and some color to be shown during all of its programming.

Starting with the premiere of the short-lived program FNMTV: Friday Night MTV in 2008, MTV started using a updated and cropped version of its original logo for the 30 years during most of its on-air programming. It became MTV's official logo on February 8, 2010, and officially debuted on its website. The channel's full text "MUSIC TELEVISION" was eliminated, with the revised and chopped down on the logo largely the same as the original logo, but without the initialism, the bottom of the "M" being cropped and the "V" in "TV" no longer branching off. This change was most likely made to reflect MTV's more prominent focus on reality and comedy programming and less on music-related programming. However, much like the original logo, the new logo was designed to be filled in with a seemingly unlimited variety of images. It is used worldwide, but not everywhere existentially. The new logo was first used on MTV Films logo with the 2010 film Jackass 3D. MTV's rebranding was overseen by Popkern.

On June 25, 2015, MTV International rebranded its on-air look with a new vaporwave and seapunk-inspired graphics package. It included a series of new station IDs featuring 3D renderings of objects and people, much akin to vaporwave and seapunk "aesthetics". Many have derided MTV's choice of rebranding, insisting that the artistic style was centered on denouncing corporate capitalism (many aesthetic pieces heavily incorporate corporate logos of the 1970s, 80s and 90s, which coincidentally include MTV's original logo) rather than being embraced by major corporations like MTV. Many have also suggested that MTV made an attempt to be relevant in the modern entertainment world with the rebrand. In addition to this, the rebrand was made on exactly the same day that the social media site Tumblr introduced Tumblr TV, an animated GIF viewer which featured branding inspired by MTV's original 1980s on-air look. Tumblr has been cited as a prominent location of aesthetic art, and thus many have suggested MTV and Tumblr "switched identities". The rebrand also incorporated a modified version of MTV's classic "I Want My MTV!" slogan, changed to read "I Am My MTV". Vice has suggested that the slogan change represents "the current generation's movement towards self-examination, identity politics and apparent narcissism." MTV also introduced MTV Bump, a website that allows Instagram and Vine users to submit videos to be aired during commercial breaks, as well as MTV Canvas, an online program where users submit custom IDs to also be aired during commercial breaks.

On February 5, 2021, MTV began to use a revised logo in tandem with the 2010 version, doing away with the 3D effect inherited from its predecessors (much akin to the current MTV Video Music Awards variant). That logo is revealed to be an alternate variant of the current logo designed by the design agency Loyalkaspar, which pays homage to MTV of the past with the red-yellow-blue color combination and the 3D effect mainly inherited from its predecessor logo. The new logo's rollout was completed in time for the 2021 MTV Video Music Awards.

"I Want My MTV!" 
The channel's iconic "I Want My MTV!" advertising campaign was launched in 1982. It was first developed by George Lois and was based on a cereal commercial from the 1950s with the slogan "I Want My Maypo!" that Lois adapted unsuccessfully from the original created by animator John Hubley.

Lois's first pitch to the network was roundly rejected when Lois insisted that rock stars like Mick Jagger should be crying when they said the tag line, not unlike his failed 'Maypo' revamp. His associate, and Seibert mentor Dale Pon took over the campaign, strategically and creatively, and was able to get the campaign greenlit when he laughed the tears out of the spots. From then on –with the exception of the closely logos on the first round of commercials– Pon was the primary creative force.

All the commercials were produced by Buzz Potamkin and his new company Buzzco Productions, directed first by Thomas Schlamme and Alan Goodman and eventually by Candy Kugel.

The campaign featured popular artists and celebrities, including Pete Townshend, Pat Benatar, Adam Ant, David Bowie, the Police, Kiss, Culture Club, Billy Idol, Hall & Oates, Cyndi Lauper, Madonna, Lionel Richie, Ric Ocasek, John Mellencamp, Peter Wolf, Joe Elliott, Stevie Nicks, Rick Springfield, and Mick Jagger, interacting with the MTV logo on-air and encouraging viewers to call their pay television providers and request that MTV be added to their local channel lineups. Eventually, the slogan became so ubiquitous that it made an appearance as a lyric sung by Sting on the Dire Straits song "Money for Nothing", whose music video aired in regular rotation on MTV when it was first released in 1985, which became the basis of the music used in the MTV Entertainment Studios production logo.

Influence and controversies 
The channel has been a target of criticism by different groups about programming choices, social issues, political correctness, sensitivity, censorship, and a perceived negative social influence on young people. Portions of the content of MTV's programs and productions have come under controversy in the general news media and among social groups that have taken offense. Some within the music industry criticized what they saw as MTV's homogenization of rock 'n' roll, including the punk band the Dead Kennedys, whose song "M.T.V.Get Off the Air" was released on their 1985 album Frankenchrist, just as MTV's influence over the music industry was being solidified. MTV was also the major influence on the growth of music videos during the 1980s.

Breaking the "color barrier" 
During MTV's first few years, very few black artists were featured. The select few in MTV's rotation between 1981 and 1984 were Michael Jackson, Prince, Eddy Grant, Tina Turner, Donna Summer, Joan Armatrading, Musical Youth, The Specials, Living Color, The Selecter, Grace Jones, John Butcher and Herbie Hancock. Mikey Craig of Culture Club, Joe Leeway of Thompson Twins and Tracy Wormworth of The Waitresses were also black. The Specials, which included black and white vocalists and musicians, were also the first act with people of color to perform on MTV; their song "Rat Race" was the 58th video on the station's first broadcast day.

MTV refused other black artists' videos, such as Rick James' "Super Freak", because they did not fit the channel's carefully selected album-oriented rock format at the time. The exclusion enraged James, who publicly advocated the addition of more black artists to the channel. David Bowie also questioned MTV's lack of black artists during an on-air interview with VJ Mark Goodman in 1983. MTV's original head of talent and acquisition, Carolyn B. Baker, who was black, questioned why the definition of music had to be so narrow, as did a few others outside the network. Years later, Baker said, "The party line at MTV was that we weren't playing black music because of the research' – but the research was based on ignorance… We were young, we were cutting-edge. We didn't have to be on the cutting edge of racism." Nevertheless, it was Baker who rejected Rick James' Super Freak video "because there were half-naked women in it, and it was a piece of crap. As a black woman, I did not want that representing my people as the first black video on MTV."

The network's director of music programming, Buzz Brindle, told an interviewer in 2006: "MTV was originally designed to be a rock music channel. It was difficult for MTV to find African American artists whose music fit the channel's format that leaned toward rock at the outset." Writers Craig Marks and Rob Tannenbaum noted that the channel "aired videos by plenty of white artists who didn't play rock." Andrew Goodwin later wrote: "[MTV] denied racism, on the grounds that it merely followed the rules of the rock business." MTV senior executive vice president Les Garland complained decades later, "The worst thing was that 'racism' bullshit... there were hardly any videos being made by black artists. Record companies weren't funding them. They never got charged with racism." However, critics of that defence pointed out that record companies were not funding videos for black artists because they knew they would have difficulty persuading MTV to play them.

In celebrating the 40th anniversary of the network's launch in 2021, current MTV Entertainment Group president Chris McCarthy acknowledged that "(o)ne of the bigger mistakes in the early years was not playing enough diverse music...but the nice thing that I’ve always learned at MTV is we have no problem owning our mistakes, quickly correcting them and trying to do the right thing and always follow where the audience is going."

Before 1983, Michael Jackson also struggled for MTV airtime. To resolve the struggle and finally "break the color barrier", the president of CBS Records, Walter Yetnikoff, denounced MTV in a strong, profane statement, threatening to take away its right to play any of the label's music. However, Les Garland, then acquisitions head, said he decided to air Jackson's "Billie Jean" video without pressure from CBS, a statement later contradicted by CBS head of Business Affairs David Benjamin in Vanity Fair.

According to The Austin Chronicle, Jackson's video for the song "Billie Jean" was "the video that broke the color barrier, even though the channel itself was responsible for erecting that barrier in the first place." But change was not immediate. "Billie Jean" was not added to MTV's "medium rotation" playlist (two to three airings per day) until it reached No. 1 on the Billboard Hot 100 chart. In the final week of March, it was in "heavy rotation", one week before the MTV debut of Jackson's "Beat It" video. Prince's "Little Red Corvette" joined both videos in heavy rotation at the end of April. At the beginning of June, "Electric Avenue" by Eddy Grant joined "Billie Jean", which was still in heavy rotation until mid-June. At the end of August, "She Works Hard for the Money" by Donna Summer was in heavy rotation on the channel. Herbie Hancock's "Rockit" and Lionel Richie's "All Night Long" were placed in heavy rotation at the end of October and the beginning of November respectively. In the final week of November, Donna Summer's "Unconditional Love" was in heavy rotation. When Jackson's elaborate video for "Thriller" was released late that year, raising the bar for what a video could be, the network's support for it was total; subsequently, more pop and R&B videos were played on MTV.

Following Jackson's and Prince's breakthroughs on MTV, Rick James did several interviews where he brushed off the accomplishment as tokenism, saying in a 1983 interview, in an episode of Mike Judge Presents: Tales from the Tour Bus on James, that "any black artist that [had] their video played on MTV should pull their [videos] off MTV."

Subsequent concepts 
HBO also had a 30-minute program of music videos called Video Jukebox, that first aired around the time of MTV's launch and lasted until late 1986. Also around this time, HBO, as well as other premium channels such as Cinemax, Showtime and The Movie Channel, occasionally played one or a few music videos between movies.

SuperStation WTBS launched Night Tracks on June 3, 1983, with up to 14 hours of music video airplay each late night weekend by 1985. Its most noticeable difference was that black artists that MTV initially ignored received airplay. The program ran until the end of May 1992.

A few markets also launched music-only channels including Las Vegas' KRLR-TV (now KSNV), which debuted in the summer of 1984 and branded as "Vusic 21". The first video played on that channel was "Video Killed the Radio Star", following in the footsteps of MTV.

Shortly after TBS began Night Tracks, NBC launched a music video program called Friday Night Videos, which was considered network television's answer to MTV. Later renamed simply Friday Night, the program ran from 1983 to 2002. ABC's contribution to the music video program genre in 1984, ABC Rocks, was far less successful, lasting only a year.

TBS founder Ted Turner started the Cable Music Channel in 1984, designed to play a broader mix of music videos than MTV's rock format allowed. But after one month as a money-losing venture, Turner sold it to MTV, who redeveloped the channel into VH1.

Shortly after its launch, the Disney Channel aired a program called DTV, a play on the MTV acronym. The program used music cuts, both from past and upcoming artists. Instead of music videos, the program used clips of various vintage Disney cartoons and animated films (from Snow White and the Seven Dwarfs to The Fox and the Hound) to go with the songs. The program aired in multiple formats, sometimes between shows, sometimes as its own program, and other times as one-off specials. The specials tended to air both on the Disney Channel and NBC. The program aired at several times between 1984 and 1999. In 2009, Disney Channel revived the DTV concept with a new series of short-form segments called Re-Micks.

Censorship 

MTV has edited a number of music videos to remove references to drugs, sex, violence, weapons, racism, homophobia, and/or advertising. Many music videos aired on the channel were either censored, moved to late-night rotation, or banned entirely from the channel.

In the 1980s, parent media watchdog groups such as the Parents Music Resource Center (PMRC) criticized MTV over certain music videos that were claimed to have explicit imagery of satanism. As a result, MTV developed a strict policy on refusal to air videos that may depict Satanism or anti-religious themes. This policy led MTV to ban music videos such as "Jesus Christ Pose" by Soundgarden in 1991 and "Megalomaniac" by Incubus in 2004; however, the controversial band Marilyn Manson was among the most popular rock bands on MTV during the late 1990s and early 2000s.

On September 28, 2016, on an AfterBuzz TV live stream, Scout Durwood said that MTV had a "no appropriation policy" that forbid her from wearing her hair in cornrows in an episode of Mary + Jane. She said, "I wanted to cornrow my hair, and they were like, 'That's racist.'"

Trademark suit 
Magyar Televízió, Hungary's public broadcaster who has a trademark on the initials MTV, registered with the Hungarian copyright office, sued the American MTV (Music Television) network for trademark infringement when the Hungarian version of the music channel was launched in 2007.  The suit is still ongoing.

Andrew Dice Clay 
During the 1989 MTV Video Music Awards ceremony, comedian Andrew Dice Clay did his usual "adult nursery rhymes" routine (which he had done in his stand-up acts), after which the network executives imposed a lifetime ban. Billy Idol's music video for the song "Cradle of Love" originally had scenes from Clay's film The Adventures of Ford Fairlane when it was originally aired; scenes from the film were later excised. During the 2011 MTV Video Music Awards, Clay was in attendance where he confirmed that the channel lifted the ban.

Beavis and Butt-head 

In the wake of controversy that involved a child burning down his house after allegedly watching Beavis and Butt-head, MTV moved the show from its original 7 p.m. time slot to an 11p.m. time slot. Also, Beavis's tendency to flick a lighter and yell "fire" was removed from new episodes, and controversial scenes were removed from existing episodes before their rebroadcast. Some extensive edits were noted by series creator Mike Judge after compiling his Collection DVDs, saying that "some of those episodes may not even exist actually in their original form."

Dude, This Sucks 
A pilot for a show called Dude, This Sucks was canceled after teens attending a taping at the Snow Summit Ski Resort in January 2001 were sprayed with liquidized fecal matter by a group known as "The Shower Rangers". The teens later sued, with MTV later apologizing and ordering the segment's removal.

Super Bowl XXXVIII halftime show 

After Viacom's purchase of CBS, MTV was selected to produce the Super Bowl XXXV halftime show in 2001, airing on CBS and featuring Britney Spears, NSYNC, and Aerosmith. Due to its success, MTV was invited back to produce another halftime show in 2004; this sparked a nationwide debate and controversy that drastically changed Super Bowl halftime shows, MTV's programming, and radio censorship.

When CBS aired Super Bowl XXXVIII in 2004, MTV was again chosen to produce the halftime show, with performances by such artists as Nelly, P. Diddy, Janet Jackson, and Justin Timberlake. The show became controversial, however, after Timberlake tore off part of Jackson's outfit while performing "Rock Your Body" with her, revealing her right breast. All involved parties apologized for the incident, and Timberlake referred to the incident as a "wardrobe malfunction".

Michael Powell, former chairman of the Federal Communications Commission, ordered an investigation the day after broadcast. In the weeks following the halftime show, MTV censored much of its programming. Several music videos, including "This Love" and "I Miss You", were edited for sexual content. In September 2004, the FCC ruled that the halftime show was indecent and fined CBS $550,000. The FCC upheld it in 2006, but federal judges reversed the fine in 2008.

Nipplegate 
Timberlake and Jackson's controversial event gave way to a "wave of self-censorship on American television unrivaled since the McCarthy era". After the sudden event, names surfaced such as nipplegate, Janet moment, and boobgate, and this spread politically, furthering the discussion into the 2004 presidential election surrounding "moral values" and "media decency".

Moral criticism 

In 2005, the Parents Television Council (PTC) released a study titled "MTV Smut Peddlers", which sought to expose excessive sexual, profane, and violent content on the channel, based on MTV's spring break programming from 2004. Jeanette Kedas, an MTV network executive, called the PTC report "unfair and inaccurate" and "underestimating young people's intellect and level of sophistication", while L. Brent Bozell III, then-president of the PTC, stated: "the incessant sleaze on MTV presents the most compelling case yet for consumer cable choice", referring to the practice of pay television companies to allow consumers to pay for channels à la carte.

In April 2008, PTC released The Rap on Rap, a study covering hip-hop and R&B music videos rotated on programs 106 & Park and Rap City, both shown on BET, and Sucker Free on MTV. PTC urged advertisers to withdraw sponsorship of those programs, whose videos PTC stated targeted children and teenagers containing adult content.

Jersey Shore 

MTV received significant criticism from Italian American organizations for Jersey Shore, which premiered in 2009. The controversy was due in large part to the manner in which MTV marketed the show, as it liberally used the word "guido" to describe the cast members. The word "guido" is generally regarded as an ethnic slur when referring to Italians and Italian Americans. One promotion stated that the show was to follow, "eight of the hottest, tannest, craziest Guidos," while yet another advertisement stated, "Jersey Shore exposes one of the tri-state area's most misunderstood species ... the GUIDO. Yes, they really do exist! Our Guidos and Guidettes will move into the ultimate beach house rental and indulge in everything the Seaside Heights, New Jersey scene has to offer."

Prior to the series debut, Unico National formally requested that MTV cancel the show. In a formal letter, the company called the show a "direct, deliberate and disgraceful attack on Italian Americans." Unico National President Andre DiMino said, "MTV has festooned the 'bordello-like' house set with Italian flags and red, white and green maps of New Jersey while every other cutaway shot is of Italian signs and symbols. They are blatantly as well as subliminally bashing Italian Americans with every technique possible." Around this time, other Italian organizations joined the fight, including the NIAF and the Order Sons of Italy in America.

MTV responded by issuing a press release which stated in part, "The Italian American cast takes pride in their ethnicity. We understand that this show is not intended for every audience and depicts just one aspect of youth culture." Following the calls for the show's removal, several sponsors requested that their ads not be aired during the show. These sponsors included Dell, Domino's Pizza, and American Family Insurance. Despite the loss of certain advertisers, MTV did not cancel the show. Moreover, the show saw its audience increase from its premiere in 2009, and continued to place as MTV's top-rated programs during Jersey Shore's six-season run, ending in 2012.

Resolutions for White Guys 
In December 2016, MTV online published a social justice-oriented New Year's resolution-themed video directed towards white men. The video caused widespread outrage online, including video responses from well-known online personas, and was deleted from MTV's YouTube channel. The video was then reuploaded to their channel, with MTV claiming the new video contained "updated graphical elements". The new video quickly received over 10,000 dislikes and fewer than 100 likes from only 20,000 views, and MTV deleted the video for a second time.

Social activism 
In addition to its regular programming, MTV has a long history of promoting social, political, and environmental activism in young people. The channel's vehicles for this activism have been Choose or Lose, encompassing political causes and encouraging viewers to vote in elections; Fight For Your Rights, encompassing anti-violence and anti-discrimination causes; think MTV; and MTV Act and Power of 12, the newest umbrellas for MTV's social activism.

Choose or Lose 

In 1992, MTV started a pro-democracy campaign called Choose or Lose, to encourage over 20 million people to register to vote, and the channel hosted a town hall forum for then-candidate Bill Clinton.

In recent years, other politically diverse programs on MTV have included True Life, which documents people's lives and problems, and MTV News specials, which center on very current events in both the music industry and the world. One special show covered the 2004 US presidential election, airing programs focused on the issues and opinions of young people, including a program where viewers could ask questions of Senator John Kerry. MTV worked with P. Diddy's "Citizen Change" campaign, designed to encourage young people to vote.

Additionally, MTV aired a documentary covering a trip by the musical group Sum 41 to the Democratic Republic of the Congo, documenting the conflict there. The group ended up being caught in the midst of an attack outside of the hotel and were subsequently flown out of the country.

The channel also began showing presidential campaign commercials for the first time during the 2008 US presidential election. This has led to criticism, with Jonah Goldberg opining that "MTV serves as the Democrats' main youth outreach program."

Rock the Vote 
MTV is aligned with Rock the Vote, a campaign to motivate young adults to register and vote.

MTV Act and Power of 12 
In 2012, MTV launched MTV Act and Power of 12, its current social activism campaigns. MTV Act focuses on a wide array of social issues, while Power of 12 was a replacement for MTV's Choose or Lose and focused on the 2012 US presidential election.

Elect This 
In 2016, MTV continued its pro-democracy campaign with Elect This, an issue-oriented look at the 2016 election targeting Millennials. Original content under the "Elect This" umbrella includes "Infographica," short animations summarizing MTV News polls; "Robo-Roundtable," a digital series hosted by animatronic robots; "The Racket," a multi-weekly digital series; and "The Stakes," a weekly political podcast.

Beyond MTV 
Since its launch in 1981, the brand "MTV" has expanded to include many additional properties beyond the original MTV channel, including a variety of sister channels in the US, dozens of affiliated channels around the world, and an Internet presence through MTV.com and related websites.

Sister channels in the US 
MTV operates a group of channels under MTV Networksa name that continues to be used for the individual units of the now Paramount Media Networks, a division of corporate parent Paramount Global. In 1985, MTV saw the introduction of its first regular sister channel, VH1, which was originally an acronym for "Video Hits One" and was designed to play adult contemporary music videos. From now on, VH1 is aimed at celebrity and popular culture programming which include many reality shows. Another sister channel, CMT, targets the southern culture market.

The advent of satellite television and digital cable brought MTV greater channel diversity, including its current sister channels MTV2 and Spanish-speaking MTV Tr3́s (now Tr3́s), which initially played music videos exclusively but now focus on other programming. MTV also formerly broadcast MTVU on campuses at various universities until 2018, when the MTV Networks on Campus division was sold, and the channel remained as a digital cable channel only. MTV used to also have MTV Hits and MTVX channels until these were converted into NickMusic and MTV Jams, respectively. MTV Jams was later rebranded as BET Jams in 2015.

In January 2006, MTV launched MTV HD, a 1080i high-definition simulcast feed of MTV. Until Viacom's main master control was upgraded in 2013, only the network's original series after 2010 (with some pre-2010 content) are broadcast in high definition, while music videos, despite being among the first television works to convert to high definition presentation in the mid-2000s, were presented in 4:3 standard definition, forcing them into a windowboxing type of presentation; since that time, all music videos are presented in HD and are framed to their director's preference. Jersey Shore, despite being shot with widescreen HD cameras, was also presented with SD windowboxing (though the 2018 Family Vacation revival is in full HD). The vast majority of providers carry MTV HD.

MTV Networks also operates MTV Live, a high-definition channel that features original HD music programming and HD versions of music related programs from MTV, VH1 and CMT. The channel was launched in January 2006 as MHD (Music: High Definition). The channel was officially rebranded as MTV Live on February 1, 2016.

In 2005 and 2006, MTV launched a list of channels for Asian Americans. The first channel was MTV Desi, launched in July 2005, dedicated towards Indian Americans. Next was MTV Chi, in December 2005, which catered to Chinese Americans. The third was MTV K, launched in June 2006 and targeted toward Korean Americans. Each of these channels featured music videos and shows from MTV's international affiliates as well as original US programming, promos, and packaging. All three of these channels ceased broadcasting on April 30, 2007.

On August 1, 2016, the 35th anniversary of the original MTV's launch, VH1 Classic was rebranded as MTV Classic. The channel's programming focused on classic music videos and programming (including notable episodes of MTV Unplugged and VH1 Storytellers), but skews more towards the 1980s, 1990s and 2000s. The network aired encores of former MTV series such as Beavis and Butt-Head and Laguna Beach: The Real Orange County. The network's relaunch included a broadcast of MTV's first hour on the air, which was also simulcast on MTV and online via Facebook live streaming. MTV Classic only retained three original VH1 Classic programs, which were That Metal Show, Metal Evolution, and Behind the Music Remastered, although repeats of current and former VH1 programs such as Pop-Up Video and VH1 Storytellers remained on the schedule. However, the rebranded MTV Classic had few viewers, and declined quickly to become the least-watched English-language subscription network rated by Nielsen at the end of 2016. At the start of 2017, it was reorganized into an all-video network.

Internet 

In the late 1980s, before the World Wide Web, MTV VJ Adam Curry began experimenting on the Internet. He registered the then-unclaimed domain name "MTV.com" in 1993 with the idea of being MTV's unofficial new voice on the Internet. Although this move was sanctioned by his supervisors at MTV Networks at the time, when Curry left to start his own web-portal design and hosting company, MTV subsequently sued him for the domain name, which led to an out-of-court settlement.

The service hosted at the domain name was originally branded "MTV Online" during MTV's first few years of control over it in the mid-1990s. It served as a counterpart to the America Online portal for MTV content, which existed at AOL keyword MTV until approximately the end of the 1990s. After this time, the website became known as simply "MTV.com" and served as the Internet hub for all MTV and MTV News content.

MTV.com experimented with entirely video-based layouts between 2005 and 2007. The experiment began in April 2005 as MTV Overdrive, a streaming video service that supplemented the regular MTV.com website. Shortly after the 2006 MTV Video Music Awards, which were streamed on MTV.com and heavily used the MTV Overdrive features, MTV introduced a massive change for MTV.com, transforming the entire site into a Flash video-based entity. Much of users' feedback about the Flash-based site was negative, demonstrating a dissatisfaction with videos that played automatically, commercials that could not be skipped or stopped, and the slower speed of the entire website. The experiment ended in February 2007 as MTV.com reverted to a traditional HTML-based website design with embedded video clips, in the style of YouTube and some other video-based websites.

From 2006 to 2007, MTV operated an online channel, MTV International, targeted to the broad international market. The purpose of the online channel was to air commercial-free music videos once the television channels started concentrating on shows unrelated to music videos or music-related programming.

The channel responded to the rise of the Internet as the new central place to watch music videos in October 2008 by launching MTV Music (later called MTV Hive), a website that featured thousands of music videos from MTV and VH1's video libraries, dating back to the earliest videos from 1981.

A newly created division of the company, MTV New Media, announced in 2008 that it would produce its own original web series, in an attempt to create a bridge between old and new media. The programming is available to viewers via personal computers, cell phones, iPods, and other digital devices.

In the summer of 2012, MTV launched a music discovery website called the MTV Artists Platform (also known as Artists.MTV). MTV explained, "While technology has made it way easier for artists to produce and distribute their own music on their own terms, it hasn't made it any simpler to find a way to cut through all the Internet noise and speak directly to all of their potential fans. The summer launch of the platform is an attempt to help music junkies and musicians close the gap by providing a one-stop place where fans can listen to and buy music and purchase concert tickets and merchandise."

MTV.com remains the official website of MTV, and it expands on the channel's broadcasts by bringing additional content to its viewers. The site features an online version of MTV News, podcasts, a commercial streaming service, movie features, profiles and interviews with recording artists and from MTV's television programs.

See also 

 List of MTV award shows
 MTV Europe
 MTV Latin America
 Music industry
 List of MTV channels

References

Citations

Bibliography 

 Blackwood, Nina/Goodman, Mark/Hunter, Alan/Quinn, Martha/Edwards, Gavin (2013). VJ: The Unplugged Adventures of MTV's First Wave. Atria. .
 Denisoff, R. Serge (1988). Inside MTV. Transaction. .
 McGrath, Tom (1996). MTV: The Making of a Revolution. Running Pr. .
 MTV (2001). MTV Uncensored. MTV. .
 Prato, Greg (2011). MTV Ruled the World: The Early Years of Music Video. Createspace. .
 Tannenbaum, Rob/Marks, Craig (2012). I Want My MTV: The Uncensored Story of the Music Video Revolution. Plume. .

External links 

 Mark Goodman, Nina Blackwood, Alan Hunter interviewed on Stuck in the '80s podcast

 
1980s fads and trends
1981 establishments in New York City
Companies based in New York City
English-language television stations in the United States
Music video networks in the United States
Race-related controversies in television
Television channels and stations established in 1981
Television networks in the United States
1985 mergers and acquisitions
Paramount Media Networks
Music television channels